RSC Anderlecht compete in the Belgian League, Belgian Cup, Belgian Supercup and UEFA Cup. (They were knocked out of the UEFA Champions League in the third qualifying round) in Season 2007-08.

Players

Transfers 2007-08

Players in

Players out

Loaned out

Competitions

Jupiler League

Classification

Results summary

Results by round

Matches

Competitive

Friendly

See also
List of R.S.C. Anderlecht seasons

References

R.S.C. Anderlecht seasons
Anderlecht